WWE World Championship may refer to the following:
 World championships in WWE – all world titles created and/or promoted by WWE throughout the company's history
 World Heavyweight Championship (WWE) – contested from 2002 to 2013; briefly called the World Championship during Rey Mysterio's two reigns (2006 and 2010)
 WWE Championship – created in 1963, it is WWE's original world title and is the current world title of WWE's Raw brand as of 2019; was briefly known as the WWE World Championship from July to December 2016
 WWE Universal Championship – created in 2016, the world title of WWE's SmackDown brand as of 2019

 Lists
 List of World Heavyweight Champions (WWE)
 List of WWE Champions

See also 
 ECW World Heavyweight Championship – created in 1992 for Extreme Championship Wrestling (ECW); WWE acquired ECW in 2003 and the championship was contested on WWE's ECW brand from 2006 to 2010
 NXT Championship – created in 2012, the top championship of WWE's NXT brand
 WCW World Heavyweight Championship – created in 1991 for World Championship Wrestling (WCW); WWE, at the time WWF, acquired WCW in March 2001 and the championship was then defended in WWE until December 2001; was briefly called the World Championship in November–December 2001